Ypthima simplicia is a butterfly in the family Nymphalidae. It is found in southern Sudan, Ethiopia, Somalia, Kenya, and northern Tanzania. The habitat consists of montane and semi-montane grassland.

References

simplicia
Butterflies of Africa
Butterflies described in 1876
Taxa named by Arthur Gardiner Butler